Owen Valley Community High School, also known as "OVHS", is a public high school located in Spencer, Indiana.

History
Built in 1971, OVHS is the result of a consolidation of several smaller schools located within Owen County. The three schools that were merged to make Owen Valley High School are Patricksburg High School, Spencer High School, and Gosport High School. The merger of these highschools is the namesake of the school paper. Additionally, those former high schools are now elementary schools.

In fall of 2003, ground was broken on the renovation and additions that have been made to the OVHS. The class of 2003 was the last to graduate from the original 1971 building. The gift from the senior class in 2003 was a cornerstone made of limestone from the Bybee Bros. Stone Quarry in Ellettsville, Indiana for the new addition and can be viewed from the front of the building. The Cornerstone was written by graduating Class Secretary Thomas Barnett. It reads as follows "Dedicated to honor those who educate students for future generations."

Athletics
Owen Valley's mascot is the Patriot, and the school's colors are red, white and blue.

See also
 List of high schools in Indiana
 Western Indiana Conference
 Spencer, Indiana

References

External links
Official Site
Twitter

Public high schools in Indiana
Educational institutions established in 1971
Buildings and structures in Owen County, Indiana
1971 establishments in Indiana